The Official Opposition Shadow Cabinet is the shadow cabinet of the main Opposition party, responsible for holding Ministers to account and for developing and disseminating the party's policy positions. In the 40th Legislative Assembly of Ontario, Canada the Official Opposition  was formed by the Progressive Conservative Party of Ontario. The shadow cabinet was announced on October 25, 2011 by Tim Hudak, Leader of the Opposition.

See also
Executive Council of Ontario
Ontario New Democratic Party Shadow Cabinet of the 40th Legislative Assembly of Ontario

Progressive Conservative Party of Ontario